Providence is a Canadian French language drama television series which aired on Ici Radio-Canada Télé from January 4, 2005 to November 22, 2011.

Plot
Taking place in the fictional town of Providence in the Eastern Townships, the series focuses on the Beauchamp family and their cheese-making enterprise that was part of the Beauchamp family for three generations. The series also focuses on Édith Beauchamp, a businesswoman who is currently head of the company.

Cast
 Monique Mercure : Édith Beauchamp
 Bernard Fortin : Pierre Lavoie
 Hugo Dubé : Bertrand Lavoie
 Sonia Vigneault : Hélèna Beauchamp
 Patrice Godin : Luc Lavoie
 Marie-Joanne Boucher : Marie-Ève Lavoie
 Isabelle Vincent : Diane Bourgeois
 Ève Lemieux : Lili-Mai Lavoie
 Luis Oliva : Diego Dumais
 Marie-Hélène Thibault : Solange Lafleur
 Jeremy T. Gaudet : Napoléon Lavoie-Lafleur
 Maxime Tremblay : Antonin Lavoie
 Anik Vermette : Julie Rioux
 Patrick Hivon : Maxime Bélanger
 Pierre Curzi : Jean-Guy Bélanger
 Nicolas Simard Lafontaine: Jean-Guy Bélanger in his childhood 
 Suzanne Garceau : Lucille Champagne
 Sylvain Carrier : Louis Duranleau
 Maude Guérin : Valérie Chénard
 Dino Tavarone : Mauro Santorelli
 Sebastien Roberts : François Berthier
 Frédérice Paquet : Charles-Éric Allan
 Benoît Girard : Robert Beauchamp
 Yan Rompré : Benoît Pilon
 Danièle Panneton : Monique Smith
 Claude Gagnon : Éliot 
 France Parent : Manon 
 Nathalie Breuer : Anne Daviau
 Josée Guindon : Françe Renaud
 Sabel Dos Santos : Fatima Macedo
 Alex Vallée : Samuel Chénard-Poulin 
 Jessica Malka: Katheleen 
 Paul Dion: Maurice 
 Maxime Morin: Véronique
 Louis-Philippe Dury: un écolier

External links 
 

2000s Canadian drama television series
2005 Canadian television series debuts
Ici Radio-Canada Télé original programming
Television shows set in Quebec
Téléromans